Suicide Slum (official name Southside) is a notorious fictional slum in publications from DC Comics. The area was first introduced in the "Newsboy Legion" feature as a slum in New York City. It was later placed in Superman's city, Metropolis, when the Newsboy Legion was reintroduced. The Southside is also known as The Simon Project in the Post-Crisis continuity.

Fictional history
Southside, also known as The Simon Project (in the Post-Crisis continuity), and most notably, Suicide Slum, has been at various times the stomping ground of several superheroes, including the Guardian (who protected the Newsboy Legion) and Black Lightning. It was based on the Lower East Side neighborhood of New York City in which Jack Kirby grew up. In the comics the district's real name is Hobb's Bay. It was occasionally referred to by this name in the alternate continuity of Lois & Clark: The New Adventures of Superman.

Suicide Slum is also the site of The Ace o' Clubs, a bar owned by Superman supporting character Bibbo Bibbowski. The human personification of the New God Black Racer lives, paralyzed, in a hospital in Suicide Slum. This was also where he was murdered.<ref>The Death of the New Gods' #1 (December 2007)</ref> The Slum is also where the villain called Sleez operates from for some time, until he is slain. It is also the childhood home of Jose Delgado (schoolteacher-turned-vigilante Gangbuster) and Jefferson Pierce (the superhero known as Black Lightning).

The early years of Suicide Slum are examined through the perspectives of two civilians, Paul Lincoln and Jimmy Mahoney. They encounter many original members of the Justice Society of America, who had been working to clear mob influence out of the area.

The "Slum" is where one of the many canines who go by the name of Krypto got his start. He was born with two siblings under the care of an elderly lady who did not understand the nature of charity assistance available, such as millionaire Bibbo Bibbowski who was handing out food nearby. Thinking the puppies were doomed to starve, she tosses them in the river. Bibbo rescues the animals. Sadly, only Krypto survives. Bibbo takes the dog into his care.

 
In a notable single issue story, "They Call It Suicide Slum", on Superman (vol. 2) #121, written and art by Dan Jurgens, its central theme is about real-life issues against urban crimes and gun violence instead the usual superhero and fantastic actions. Superman made less appearances on this story, instead it was more about Clark Kent and the column he is writing about "The Simon Project" for The Daily Planet. Known as "Southside" and "Suicide Slum", the area is believed by many to be beyond help, even Superman's. When a child, Lateesha Johnson, witnessed a local gang murder a group of local kids who were playing basketball for no apparent reasons, she became a target. The criminals feared she would tell the police of what she saw.

Clark Kent learns the residents believe Superman does not care. As Superman, he targets every known criminal and destroys every gun, hoping to also protect Lateesha.

However, an unnamed arms dealer, who works for "Mr. L.", supplies more unregistered guns to the neighborhood's criminals. Lateesha is injured and Clark, not caring that he is risking his secret (although it is safe as no one notice him using his powers during the chaos resulted from the attack), gets her to help. He feels the overwhelming fear, helplessness and outrage of the citizenry. As Clark Kent his column garners enough attention that Lateesha's family is able to move and more officers are assigned to patrol the Project. Superman himself also steps up his patrolling of the area.

Later, the superhero Steel, AKA John Henry Irons, establishes his base of operations in the area, in an old warehouse. Another superhero moves into the area. Superboy, the clone known as Kon-El, becomes a supervisor of the building called "Calvin Gardens". Residents of the building generally admire Superboy. This soon includes a murderous super-criminal (Brother Yellow) who cons his way into renting the unite just below Superboy's place of residence. Kon's later elimination of the Run Riot gang simply earns him more respect from the Slum residents, who despised the criminals. Another super-battle destroys the popular Slum restaurant The Feedbag, turning many residents against Superboy. Calvin Gardens is obliterated due to a mad bomber. While Superboy saves the lives of the citizens, he decides to move to Smallville to gain control over his powers. Superman reassures Kon-El the B-13 virus will rebuild the actual Gardens, allowing the citizens at least a place to live.

City of tomorrow
When Brainiac-13 turns Metropolis into a "city of tomorrow", Southside becomes the site of vast engines and uncontrolled conduits. Its harbor area is lost to a huge hydroelectric dam, creating a sheer drop that became a popular suicide point. John Henry Irons helps CAELOSS (Citizen's Army for the Economic Liberation of Suicide Slum) in trying to ensure the residents are not totally disenfranchised by the "new" Metropolis. Like the rest of the city, the Slum has since reverted to its old form.

The area is featured visually during a destructive battle between Superman and the villain Ruin. It is also a purchasable property in the in-universe board game based on the city, Metrolopoly.

Luthor's roots
According to then-current Post-Crisis continuity (1986–2004), Lex Luthor grew up in Southside (Suicide Slum) alongside Perry White; he was able to escape the slum and set up his first company with the insurance payout following his parents' apparently accidental deaths, which he had orchestrated. In Pre-Crisis continuity, Lex grew up in Smallville alongside Clark Kent, and subsequent continuity retcons (in Birthright and further changes post-Action Comics #850) have reintroduced new variations of the Smallville origin to the modern Luthor, largely to create greater similarity with the TV show Smallville.

Other versions
A 1940s version of Suicide Slum was spotlighted in volume one of Elseworld's Finest. A more modern version became the focus of a two-part story when Metropolis was trapped up an alien dome for a full year. Catwoman, who had been visiting when the dome went up, adopted the Suicide Slum. She attempted to protect it and the city from Bruno Mannheim, a gangster who had gained power through advanced technology. A future version exists on Takron-Galtos in the year 3001.

In other media
Television
 In the television series Smallville, Lionel Luthor grew up in Suicide Slum and befriended future crime lord Morgan Edge there. Clark Kent visited the district several times, first during the episode "Run" where he had to track down a fence who threatened to kill Bart Allen and during "Vengeance" where he and a masked vigilante were tracking the same criminal there. During the episode "Persona", a severely weakened Brainiac hides in the district posing as a homeless man until he is visited by Bizarro (who asks for assistance against the returning Clark Kent).
 In the Black Lightning TV series, the setting of Freeland sports many of the same issues as Suicide Slum.
 Suicide Slum appears in DC Super Hero Girls, although in this continuity, it is known as "Sinister Slum".

Video games
 Suicide Slum is featured in DC Universe Online. The Ace O' Clubs, Metropolis Shipyards, and Steelworks are located here and can be visited by the players. It is around here where Circe mind-controls Aquaman into leading the Atlantean armies into attacking Metropolis.
 Suicide Slum is featured in Superman Returns'' video game.

References

1942 in comics
Fictional elements introduced in 1942
Fictional neighborhoods
Metropolis (comics)
Slums